Live at The Bread Factory is the second release of the Montreal-based instrumental act Torngat.

Track listing
"Fly Stuff"
"Surf"
"Bye Bye Sly"
"Finger Painting"
"Baldy Walk"
"La Rouge"
"Alberta Song"
"Hide and Seek"

2004 albums
Torngat albums